"Make You Feel My Love", also known as "To Make You Feel My Love", is a song written by Bob Dylan for his album Time Out of Mind, released in September 1997. It was first released commercially in August 1997 by Billy Joel for his compilation album Greatest Hits Volume III.

It is one of the few songs to have achieved the status of becoming a "standard" in the 21st century, having been covered by more than 450 different artists. Cover versions have been recorded by  Elkie Brooks, Adele, Michael Bolton, Neil Diamond, Boy George, Bryan Ferry, Joan Osborne, Teddy Swims, Garth Brooks, Shane Filan, Kelly Clarkson, Ane Brun, Michael Bublé, Clare Dunn, Sleeping at Last, Nick Knowles, and Pink.

Reception
Spectrum Culture included the song on a list of "Bob Dylan's 20 Best Songs of the '90s". In an article accompanying the list, critic John Paul described it thus: "Accompanied by a lone piano, ghostlike bass line and slightly woozy sounding organ playing sustained notes throughout, the arrangement of the song isn’t terribly remarkable, the meat of the song itself relying on Dylan’s surprisingly emotional read and jazz-like chord progression".

Ultimate Classic Rock critic Matthew Wilkening rated "Make You Feel My Love" as the 7th best song Dylan recorded between 1992 and 2011, praising it as a "weary, textured masterpiece".

A 2021 Guardian article included it on a list of "80 Bob Dylan songs everyone should know".

Personnel
Bob Dylan – piano, vocals

Additional musicians
Tony Garnier – upright bass
Augie Meyers – organ

Live performances
According to his official website, Dylan performed the song live over 300 times in concert between 1997 and 2019 on the Never Ending Tour. A live version performed in Los Angeles in 1998 was released on Dylan's "Things Have Changed" CD single in 2000. The live debut occurred at Columbia Township Auditorium in Columbia, South Carolina on November 2, 1997, and the last performance (to date) took place at The Anthem in Washington, D.C. on December 8, 2019.

Billy Joel version

Billy Joel released his version of the song, titled "To Make You Feel My Love", for his compilation album Greatest Hits Volume III (1997). It was released as the album's lead single and reached number 50 on the US Billboard Hot 100, to date his last appearance on the chart. Joel's single pre-dated Dylan's release of the song by one month.

Chart history

Garth Brooks version

Garth Brooks covered the song as "To Make You Feel My Love" in 1998. It appeared on the soundtrack of the 1998 film Hope Floats, along with a cover version by Trisha Yearwood as the first and last tracks. It was included first as the bonus track on Fresh Horses for Brooks' first Limited Series box set and then included on all later pressings of that album. Brooks' version resulted in a nomination at 41st Grammy Award for Best Male Country Vocal Performance and a nomination for Bob Dylan for Best Country Song.

Charts

Weekly charts

Year-end charts

Adele version

In 2008, British singer-songwriter Adele recorded "Make You Feel My Love" for her debut studio album 19 (2008). It was released as the album's fourth and final single on October 27, 2008, both on CD and vinyl, originally peaking at number 26.

Background
"Make You Feel My Love" is the only cover version on Adele's debut album 19; she either wrote or co-wrote all the others. 

She listened to the song under pressure from her manager and loved it, although she did not want a cover version on her album, worried that it implies that she is incapable of writing enough of her own songs.

Piano is played by Neil Cowley and Adele is credited with bass.

Critical reception
According to Alex Fletcher of Digital Spy, the version expresses Adele's affection for the song, "with just piano as backing, her dreamy, passionate vocals are allowed to shine".

According to Dave Simpson of The Guardian, with her "hushed delivery", Adele makes the song "her own".

In January 2013, Heart Radio listed Adele's recording as the UK's number one song of all time in its Hall of Fame Top 500.

Chart performance
Initially, the song only reached a peak of number 26, but found a new lease of life in 2010, two years after its release, following performances by several contestants on the seventh series of The X Factor. In September 2010, after it was performed by Annastasia Baker, it re-entered the UK Singles Chart at number 24. The song then surged to number 4 the following month after a second performance by Gamu Nhengu. Following a third X Factor performance and heavy use in the Comic Relief 2010 television, it spent three more non-consecutive weeks in the top 10. Thanks to this newfound attention, "Make You Feel My Love" was the 48th biggest selling song of 2010. In early 2011 the song returned to the top 40 again, at number 34, after it was used on the fifth series of Britain's Got Talent.

After years of trickle selling, "Make You Feel My Love" passed the million sales mark in the UK in 2017.

Music video
The song's music video features Adele singing the song in London Marriott Hotel Canary Wharf. It was directed by Mat Kirkby. As of October 2021, the music video has received over 180 million views on YouTube.

Live performances
On Friday, November 20, 2015, Adele sang the song during a BBC special, Adele at the BBC, hosted by talk show host Graham Norton. One segment of the show, which went viral, featured a prank in which eight Adele impersonators were invited to audition at the Wimbledon Theatre for a nonexistent show. Adele herself, disguised as a nanny named "Jenny", pretended to also be an Adele impersonator, and was the last one to sing. When she started singing "Make You Feel My Love", the other performers finally recognized her and realized they had been pranked.

Usage in media
Adele's version features in the soundtrack of the 2010 romantic comedy film When in Rome. Her cover version was also featured in the compilation album for the benefit of those affected by Supertyphoon Haiyan in the Philippines entitled Songs for the Philippines.

During a concert at London's O2 Arena on March 22, 2016, the day of the Brussels bombings, Adele dedicated a performance of the song to the victims of the attacks.

In addition, Adele's video of the song, directed by Mat Kirby, was released on music channels in late September 2008 and continues to be featured on her website.

List of recordings
Digital download 
"Make You Feel My Love" – 3:32

Digital download 
"Make You Feel My Love" – 3:32
"Make You Feel My Love"  – 3:32

CD single
"Make You Feel My Love" – 3:32
"Painting Pictures" – 3:33

19 version
"Make You Feel My Love" – 3:32

19 Deluxe version
"Make You Feel My Love"  – 3:52

Chimes of Freedom live version
"Make You Feel My Love"  – 4:04

Live at the Royal Albert Hall live version
"Make You Feel My Love"  – 3:48

Charts

Weekly charts

Year-end charts

Certifications

In popular culture
Two covers of the song (one by Garth Brooks and one by Trisha Yearwood, whom Brooks would marry in 2005) were featured on the soundtrack of the 1998 film Hope Floats.

References

External links
 Lyrics at Bob Dylan's official site
 The Story of "Make You Feel My Love" on YouTube

1997 singles
1997 songs
1998 singles
2008 singles
Adele songs
Garth Brooks songs
Bob Dylan songs
Billy Joel songs
Capitol Records Nashville singles
Columbia Records singles
Song recordings produced by Jim Abbiss
Song recordings produced by Daniel Lanois
Songs written by Bob Dylan
UK Independent Singles Chart number-one singles
XL Recordings singles